Brian McNaughton (23 September 1935 – 13 May 2004) was an American writer of horror and fantasy fiction who mixed sex, satire and black humour. He also wrote thrillers.

Biography
Born at Red Bank, New Jersey, McNaughton attended Harvard and worked for ten years as a reporter for the Newark Evening News. He later held a variety of other jobs, meanwhile publishing about two hundred short stories in magazines and several books.

Several of his novels were first published by Carlyle Books under editorially imposed titles implying that they were part of a series. Although Worse Things Waiting follows on from Downward to Darkness, the other books featured completely unrelated characters and situations. Restored texts of these books have been published by Wildside Press under their original titles.

His work includes literary nods to writers such as H. P. Lovecraft, Robert E. Howard, Clark Ashton Smith and Bram Stoker. His story "The Return of the Colossus" is a sequel to Smith's "The Colossus of Ylourgne" set during World War I; while the title of "To My Dear Friend Hommy-Beg" echoes Stoker's dedication for Dracula.

The Throne of Bones, a collection of horror-fantasy stories about ghouls set in an opulent, decadent world reminiscent of Clark Ashton Smith, won the World Fantasy Award for best collection and was nominated for the Bram Stoker Award for Best Fiction Collection.

Bibliography

Novels
 In Flagrant Delight (1972)
 Gemini Rising (1977; editorially altered version published as Satan's Love Child; restored text 2000)
 Buster Callan (1978)
 Downward to Darkness (1978; editorially altered version published as Satan's Mistress; restored text 2000)
 Guilty Until Proven Guilty (1979)
 Worse Things Waiting (1979; editorially altered version published as Satan's Seductress; restored text 2000)
 The House Across the Way (1982; editorially altered version published as Satan's Surrogate; restored text 2001)

Short Story Collections
 The Throne of Bones (1997)
 Nasty Stories (2000)
 Even More Nasty Stories (2000)

References

External links
 
 Author page at Goodreads
 

1935 births
2004 deaths
20th-century American novelists
American fantasy writers
American horror writers
American male novelists
American thriller writers
Harvard University alumni
People from Red Bank, New Jersey
World Fantasy Award-winning writers
Novelists from New Jersey
American male short story writers
20th-century American short story writers
20th-century American male writers